Ebola (อีโบล่า) is a Thai rock band from Bangkok, Thailand, currently signed to Warner Music. The band's hit singles include "Saeng Sawang" (แสงสว่าง - Enlighten), "Klab Su Jud Reum Ton" (กลับสู่จุดเริ่มต้น - Back to Beginning) and "Sing Tee Chan Pen" (สิ่งที่ฉันเป็น - As I Am). In 2005, Ebola's fourth studio album, Enlighten, won Best Rock Album from Hamburger magazine.

Biography
Ebola was formed in 1996 by a young rock quintet while they were studying at Dhonburi Rajabhat University. They spent years performing under the name Ebola, mainly as an underground band. With their energetic live performances, they gained more popularity among the underground audiences. Ebola released three records (one EP and two studio albums) under independent labels, including E.P 97 (Demo - 1997), In My Hate (1999) and Satisfy (2001).

The band released their first live album, Ebola Live, under the distribution of Warner Music Thailand in 2002. Later that year, they also released their Live to Play VCD. The album contained live performances, footage and interviews with the band.

Ebola gained wider attention when they released Pole, their third studio album in 2004. The singles off the album include "Kwam Pen Pai" (ความเป็นไป), "Jam" (จำ - Remember) and "Nai Kwam มเป็นคน - In Humanhood). With their accumulated reputation, Ebola had the opportunity to perform as the opening act for Linkin Park and Slipknot during their 2004 tours in Thailand. Specifically at Linkin Park Live in Bangkok, Ebola performed several of their hits in front of an audience of 30,000 people, marking a big breakthrough for the band.

Enlighten was released in August 2005. The album contained chart-topping hits including "Saeng Sawang" (แสงสว่าง - Enlighten), "Klab Su Jud Reum Ton" (กลับสู่จุดเริ่มต้น - Back to Beginning) and "Sing Tee Chan Pen" (สิ่งที่ฉันเป็น - As I Am). They won Best Producer with their long-time producer, Warut Rintranuku, at the 2005 Seed Awards, and also earned the Best Rock Album from Hamburger magazine.

March 25, 2006 was Ebola's 10th anniversary as artists. To celebrate their first ten years, the band held Survivor Concert, gathering their longtime fans. The concert took place at Thunder Dome, Muang Thong Thani.

In April 2007, the band received more mainstream national attention when their ballad hit from Enlighten – "Sing Tee Chan Pen" (สิ่งที่ฉันเป็น - As I Am) was selected to be a theme song of the movie Me ... Myself. The film starred Ananda Everingham and Chayanan Manomaisantibhap, being produced and directed by Pongpat Wachirabunjong. Both the movie and the theme song became smash hits.

The Way was their fifth album with lead single "Wi Tee Thang" (วิถีทาง - The Way). The highly anticipated album was released in August 2007. In this album, they included new musical elements like classical music [in "Wi Tee Thang" (วิถีทาง - The Way) and "Kaan Jak La" (การจากลา - Farewell)] and piano [in "Dao Duang Sud Tai" (ดาวดวงสุดท้าย - The Last Shooting Star)] into their rock and metal influences. Ebola was nominated for Producer of the Year, Rock Album of the Year, Rock Artist of the Year at the Seed Awards 2007, but didn't win.

During 2009, it was revealed that Ebola had signed a new contract with GMM Grammy.

In terms of international collaborations, the band had opportunity to work with the Philippine rock band – Rivermaya in "Thang Leuk" (ทางเลือก - The Choice). The Way was mastered by Dave Collins, a world-class mastering engineer who mastered top-charted albums such as Linkin Park's Minutes To Midnight, Sum 41's All Killer No Filler, Madonna's Selection From Evita, No Doubt's No Doubt and The Police's Outlandos d’Amour.

In 2010, Ebola released their sixth studio album, titled 5:59. The album contained singles such as "Aow Hai Tai" (เอาให้ตาย - To The Death) and "Wan Tee Mai Mee Jing" (วันที่ไม่มีจริง - The Day That Doesn't Exist).

In 2011, Ebola and another band, Sweet Mullet, played as Opening Act for Linkin Park Live in Bangkok A Thousand Suns World Tour 2011.

Ebola released their seventh studio album in 2013, Still Alive (EP: 2013) with Warner Music.

Band members
 Kittisak "Aey" Buaphan - Lead vocals
 Wannit "Golf" Puntarikapa - Lead guitar
 Surapong "Ao" Buaphan - Rhythm guitar
 Chaowalit "A" Prasongsin - Bass guitar
 Pongpan "Pan" Peonimit - Drums

Discography
 E.P.97 (Demo) (1997)
 In My Hate (1998)
 Satisfy (2000)
 Pole (2004)
 Enlighten (2005)
 The Way (2007)
 5:59 (2010)
 Still Alive (EP: 2013) (2013)

Live albums 
 EBOLA LIVE (2002)
 SURVIVOR CONCERT (2006)

References

External links
 Thai Artist warnermusic.co.th
 Ebola on Myspace
 

Thai heavy metal musical groups
Musical groups from Bangkok